Andriy Dombrovskyi (born 22 August 1995) is a Ukrainian professional footballer who plays as a midfielder for Bruk-Bet Termalica Nieciecza.

Career
Dombrovskyi is a product of the FC Hart-Ros Irpen and two Kyivan Youth Sportive Schools: Obolon-Zmina and Zirka. His first trainer was Oleksandr Kaploushenko. He spent his career as a player for FC Illichivets Mariupol in the Ukrainian Premier League Reserves and after for Arsenal Kyiv.

Desna Chernihiv
On 25 July 2019 he moved to Desna Chernihiv. On 24 August 2019, he made his debut for the team against FC Oleksandriya, replacing Andriy Bohdanov in the 80th minute. With Desna Chernihiv he earned a 4th-place finish in the 2019-20 Ukrainian Premier League season and qualified for the 2020–21 Europa League third qualifying round for the first time in club history.

On 12 September 2021 he was elected Man of the Match for a league victory over Vorskla Poltava.

Loan to Bruk-Bet Termalica
On 25 March 2022, he moved on loan to Polish Ekstraklasa side Bruk-Bet Termalica Nieciecza. On 3 April he made his debut with the new club in the 2021–22 Ekstraklasa against Radomiak Radom at the Stadion Sportowy Bruk-Bet Termalica.

Bruk-Bet Termalica
On 13 June 2022, despite Bruk-Bet Termalica's relegation to I liga, he joined the team permanently on a three-year deal. On 15 July 2022, he made his league debut against Odra Opole at the Stadion Sportowy Bruk-Bet Termalica.

Outside of professional football
In March 2022, during the Siege of Chernihiv, Andriy Dombrovskyi, together with other former Desna Chernihiv players, raised money for the civilian population of the city of Chernihiv.

Career statistics

Club

Honours
FC Arsenal Kyiv
 Ukrainian First League: 2017–18
 Ukrainian Second League: 2015–16

FC Illichivets-2 Mariupol
 Ukrainian Premier League Reserves: 2013–14

References

External links
 Profile on Official website of FC Desna Chernihiv
Statistics at FFU website (Ukr)

1995 births
Living people
Footballers from Kyiv
Ukrainian footballers
Ukrainian expatriate footballers
Association football midfielders
FC Mariupol players
FC Arsenal Kyiv players
FC Desna Chernihiv players
Bruk-Bet Termalica Nieciecza players
Ukrainian Premier League players
Ukrainian First League players
Ukrainian Second League players
Ekstraklasa players
I liga players
Expatriate footballers in Poland
Ukrainian expatriate sportspeople in Poland